Hakim Borahsasar (born 14 January 1995) is a Belgian professional footballer who plays as a forward for Sint-Lenaarts.

Career
He signed for NAC Breda in January 2015, from Club Brugge.

References

External links

1995 births
Living people
Belgian footballers
Club Brugge KV players
NAC Breda players
A.S. Verbroedering Geel players
Eredivisie players
Eerste Divisie players
Association football forwards
Belgian expatriate footballers
Belgian expatriate sportspeople in the Netherlands
Expatriate footballers in the Netherlands
Footballers from Antwerp